Euglandina sowerbyana is a species of predatory air-breathing land snail, a terrestrial pulmonate gastropod mollusk in the family Spiraxidae.

Subspecies 
 Euglandina sowerbyana sowerbyana (Pfeiffer, 1846)
 Euglandina sowerbyana estephaniae (Strebel, 1875)

References

Spiraxidae
Gastropods described in 1846